Maryam al-Nahhas (1859–1888) was an Arab activist and writer.

Brought up in Beirut, Maryam al-Nahhas married Nasim Nawfal when she was about sixteen years old, and the couple moved to settle in Alexandria. She wrote a biographical dictionary of women, Ma'rid al-Hasna' fi Tarajim Mashahir al-Nisa'  (Dictionary of the exemplary in the lives of famous women). The first volume was published in 1879, dedicated to its sponsor, Isma'il Pasha's third wife, Princess Cheshmat Hanim. However, the manuscript of the second volume was lost in the confusion of the ‘Urabi Revolt.

Her daughter was the journalist Hind Nawfal.

References

1859 births
1888 deaths
Lebanese emigrants to Egypt
Writers from Beirut
Egyptian writers
Women biographers
19th-century biographers
Arab biographers
Egyptian women's rights activists
19th-century Lebanese writers
19th-century Egyptian women writers